This is the List of castles and châteaux located in Prague, the capital city of the Czech Republic. There are many palaces and châteaux in the area, therefore this list is not complete. After the name of the castle or château comes the area where it is located, the architectural style in which it was built or remodeled, and a short description of the subject.

Table of contents

See also
 List of castles in the Czech Republic
 List of castles in Europe
 List of castles

References

External links
 Castles, Chateaux, and Ruins 
 Czech Republic — Manors, Castles, Historical Towns 
 Hrady.cz 

Lists of castles in Europe
castles
Castles in Prague
Prague